Rethona is a genus of moths in the family Cossidae.

Species
Rethona albifasciata (Hampson, 1910)
Rethona strigosa Walker, 1855

References

Natural History Museum Lepidoptera generic names catalog

Cossinae